Miskovice is a municipality and village in Kutná Hora District in the Central Bohemian Region of the Czech Republic. It has about 1,100 inhabitants.

Administrative parts
Villages of Bylany, Hořany, Mezholezy and Přítoky are administrative parts of Miskovice.

Geography
It lies in an agricultural landscape in the Upper Sázava Hills.

History
The first written mention of Miskovice is from 1131.

Archaeology
In 2003, the first Czech fossil bones of a non-avian dinosaur were found in an abandoned quarry in the municipality. These belong to a small ornithopod related to the popular genus Iguanodon.

Sights
A notable building is the former Renaissance fortress in Přítoky. It dates from the end of the 16th century. Later it was rebuilt into a homestead, but many Renaissance elements have been preserved.

Notable people
Antonietta Brandeis (1848–1926), Czech-Italian painter

References

External links

Villages in Kutná Hora District